Koboltveien is a neighbourhood in the city of Kristiansand in Agder county, Norway. It is located in the borough of Grim and in the district of Tinnheia. It mostly consists of apartments and it is close to the lake Eigevann. The Tinnheia torv neighborhood lies next to Kolboltveien.

References

Geography of Kristiansand
Neighbourhoods of Kristiansand